Lance Smith may refer to:

Lance Smith (American football) (born 1963), American National Football League player
Lance L. Smith (born 1946), United States Air Force general
Lance Smith (politician) (born 1910), Rhodesian farmer and politician